Pratap Singh Khachariyawas (born 16 May 1969) is an Indian National Congress politician, who is presently the Cabinet Minister (Transport and Soldiers Welfare Dept.) in the Government of Rajasthan. He is also one of the Cabinet Ministers in the government, which is headed by Ashok Gehlot. Pratap Singh has held the post of the spokesperson of Rajasthan Pradesh Congress Committee and president of Jaipur Congress since 2015, previously he served as a Member of the Legislative Assembly (MLA) in Civil Lines Vidhan Sabha from 2008 to 2013.

Early life 
Pratap Singh Khachariyawas belongs to the Rajput community and was born on 16 May 1969 in Jodhpur. He is the son of Laxman Singh Shekhawat and Himmat Kanwar. He completed his school education from Adarsh Vidya Mandir, Kishangarh Renewal and later from Tagore Vidya Bhavan, Jaipur 9th to 11th studied in Maheshwari Higher Secondary School, Jaipur. Apart from this, he has completed MA in political science and LLB, Rajasthan college BA and MA from Rajasthan University Jaipur.

Personal life 
Pratap Singh Khachariyawas is the nephew of ex-vice president Bhairon Singh Shekhawat. Pratap Singh Khachariyawas married Neeraj Kanwar, he has two sons Aditya Vardhan and Krishna Vardhan. Recently he is living at M-13 Madram Pura Civil Lines, Jaipur with his family.

Political career 
Pratap Singh Khachariyawas started his political career as an independent President of University of Rajasthan (1992–93); He was also a member of legislative assembly from Civil Lines, Jaipur (2008–13). Currently, he is cabinet minister in Rajasthan government and state spokesperson of Rajasthan Pradesh Congress Committee and president of Jaipur. Pratap Singh Khachariyawas is one of the most powerful politicians/leaders in Rajasthan of the Congress party.

Membership of Legislative Assembly 
 2008–13, member Rajasthan Legislative Assembly from Civil Lines Vidhan Sabha.
 2018- present, member Rajasthan legislative assembly from Civil Lines Vidhan Sabha.

References 

1969 births
Indian National Congress politicians
Living people
Rajasthan MLAs 2008–2013
Rajasthan MLAs 2018–2023